is a former Japanese football player.

Playing career
Endo was born in Shimada on July 7, 1968. After graduating from Shizuoka Gakuen High School, he joined Prefectural Leagues club Chuo Bohan (later Avispa Fukuoka) in 1987. He played many matches as forward and the club was promoted to Regional Leagues in 1988 and Japan Soccer League in 1991. In 1992, Japan Soccer League was folded and founded the club joined new league Japan Football League. The club won the champions in 1995 and was promoted to J1 League from 1996. In 1997, he moved to Sagawa Express Tokyo. He retired end of 1997 season.

Club statistics

References

External links

1968 births
Living people
Association football people from Shizuoka Prefecture
Japanese footballers
Japan Soccer League players
J1 League players
Japan Football League (1992–1998) players
Avispa Fukuoka players
Association football forwards